S. africana may refer to:
 Sasia africana, the African piculet, a bird species
 Sparrmannia africana, the African hemp, a plant species
 Spirostachys africana, a tree species
 Squatina africana, the African angelshark, a shark species

See also
 Africana (disambiguation)